This is a list of artists who record or have recorded for Arista Records.
Listed in parentheses are names of affiliated labels.
Artists known by their full name are listed categorically by last name.



0-9
 5th Dimension

A
 A Flock of Seagulls (Jive/Arista US)
 Ace of Base (Americas/Japan)
 Adema
 Air Supply (outside Oceania and Canada)
 The Alan Parsons Project
 Sasha Allen (Divine Mill/Arista)
 Keith Anderson (Arista Nashville)
 Anderson Bruford Wakeman Howe
 Asleep at the Wheel (Arista Nashville)
 Sherrié Austin (Arista Nashville)
 Automatic Black
Armaan Malik
 Audrey Nuna

B
 Babyface
 Babylon A.D.
 Bandit
 Bay City Rollers
 Jeff Black (Arista Austin)
 Black Box (Deconstruction/Arista)
 Black Rob (Bad Boy/Arista)
 Blackhawk (Arista Nashville)
 Blood Donor
 The Blues Band
 Angela Bofill
 The Bogmen
 BoneCrusher (So So Def/Arista)
 David Bowie (Savage/Arista)
 BR549 (Arista Nashville)
 Brand Nubian
 The Braxtons
 Anthony Braxton
 Toni Braxton (LaFace/Arista)
 Breakwater
 The Brecker Brothers
 Brooks & Dunn (Arista Nashville)
 Shannon Brown (Arista Nashville)
 Jake Bugg (US)

C
 Camel (band)
 Camp Lo (Profile/Arista)
 Blu Cantrell
 Caravan
 Eric Carmen
 Jason Michael Carroll (Arista Nashville)
 Deana Carter (Arista Nashville)
 David Cassidy
 Cee-Lo
 The Church (outside Oceania)
 Ciara (Futuristic/Arista)
 Clipse (Star Trak/Arista)
 Jim Collins (Arista Nashville) 
 Sean "Diddy" Combs (Bad Boy/Arista)
 Kristy Lee Cook (Arista Nashville)
 Deborah Cox
 Crash Test Dummies
 Rob Crosby (Arista Nashville)
 Cruzados
 Courtney Hadwin (US)

D
 Paula DeAnda 
 Da Brat (So So Def/Arista)
 Da King & I (Rowdy/Arista)
 David Glen Eisley
 Clint Daniels (Arista Nashville)
 Linda Davis (Arista Nashville)
 Paul Davis
 Taylor Dayne
 Deep Dish (deConstruction/Arista)
 Diamond Rio (Arista Nashville)
 Dido
 Dion
  (Arista Latin)
 DJ Quik (Profile/Arista)
 Dream (Bad Boy/Arista)
 Dreams So Real
 Duck Sauce (Ultra/Arista)
 Ian Dury

E
 Dave Edmunds
 Electrasy
 Enuff Z'Nuff
 Eurythmics (US)
 Faith Evans (Bad Boy/Arista)
 Every Mother's Nightmare
 Exile (Arista Nashville)
 Exposé

F
 Faithless
 Fela Anikulapo Kuti
 Five
 Foreigner
 Radney Foster (Arista Austin)
 Fourplay
 Aretha Franklin
 From Zero
 Fuzzbubble

G
 Gary Glitter
 Global Communication (Dedicated/Arista)
 Gob
 Goodie Mob (LaFace/Arista)
 GQ
 Tammy Graham (Career/Arista Nashville)
 Grateful Dead
Greyson Chance
 GTR (outside Japan)

H
 Happy the Man
 Haddaway
 Courtney Hadwin
 Haircut One Hundred
 Hall & Oates
 Anthony Hamilton (LaFace/Arista)
 Havana Mena (Heat Music)
 Jeff Healey
 Heaven 17 (US)
 Nick Heyward
 Taylor Hicks
 The Hollow Men
 Whitney Houston
 Rebecca Lynn Howard (Arista Nashville)
 Jennifer Hudson
 Phyllis Hyman

I
 Icicle Works
 Iggy Pop
 Illegal (Rowdy/Arista)
 Neil Innes
 Isyss

J
 Alan Jackson (Arista Nashville)
 Jermaine Jackson
 J-Kwon
 Jamal (Rowdy/Arista)
 Brett James (Career/Arista Nashville)
 Flaco Jiménez (Arista Texas)
 Carolyn Dawn Johnson (Arista Nashville)
 Jon and Vangelis
 Stanley Jordan
 Joy Again

K
 Kashif
 Keedy
 Robert Earl Keen (Arista Texas)
 Kelis (Star Trak/Arista)
 Kenny G
 Alicia Keys
 Kings of Leon
 The Kinks
 The KLF (US/Canada)
 Koffee Brown (Divine Mill/Arista)
 Krokus
 Kenzie Ziegler

L
 Latin Quarter
 Kenny Lattimore
 Avril Lavigne
 Annie Lennox (US)
 Blake Lewis
 Linda Lewis
 Alison Limerick
 The Limit
 Lisa Lopes
 Lola Brooke (Team Eighty/Arista)
 Jeff Lorber
 Lupe Fiasco
 Lyte Funky Ones

M
 M People (non-US)
 Craig Mack (Bad Boy/Arista)
 Madagascar
 Mama's Boys (Jive/Arista)
 Måneskin
 Melissa Manchester
 Manfred Mann's Earth Band
 Barry Manilow (Arista/RCA)
 Ma$e (Bad Boy/Arista)
 Hugh Masekela (Jive Afrika/Arista)
 Harvey Mason 
 Sarah McLachlan (Nettwerk/Arista)
 Meat Loaf (outside US/Canada)
 Michael Stanley Band
 Mike & the Mechanics
 Robert Miles (deConstruction/Arista)
 Milli Vanilli (US/Canada)
 Ministry
 Kylie Minogue (Deconstruction/Arista)
 Monica (Rowdy/Arista)
 The Monkees
 Moodswings
 Abra Moore (Arista Austin)
 Chanté Moore
 Dude Mowrey (Arista Nashville)
 Lennon Murphy

N
 Naughty by Nature
 N II U
 Nerf Herder
 Peter Nero
 Next (Divine Mill/Arista)
 Willie Nile
 No Mercy
 Nodesha
 The Notorious B.I.G. (Bad Boy/Arista)
 Nova
 Tina Novak

O
 Billy Ocean (Jive/Arista)
 Tony Orlando & Dawn
 OutKast (LaFace/Arista)
 Outlaws

P
 Eric Prydz

Q
 Q-Tip
 Qkumba Zoo

R
 Real McCoy
 Lou Reed
Rick Danko
 Nydia Rojas (Arista Latin)
 Run-D.M.C. (Profile/Arista)

S
The Samples
Santana
 Gil Scott-Heron
 Secret Affair
 Shihad
 Showaddywaddy 
 Shyne (Bad Boy/Arista)
 Sigala
 Silver
 Carly Simon
 Simple Minds (Europe/Australia)
 Sister 7 (Arista Austin)
 Sky
 Slik
 Heather Small
 Patti Smith
 Smith & Thell
 Snap!
 Spiritualized (Dedicated/Arista)
 Lisa Stansfield (US)
 Al Stewart (US/Canada)
 Jermaine Stewart
 Angie Stone
 Steely Dan
 Straitjacket Fits
 Stray Cats (outside North America)
 Spider Webb

T
 T.I.
 Tiny Meat Gang
 TJ Davis
 Take That (US/Canada)
 Tha' Rayne (Divine Mill/Arista)
 Carl Thomas (Bad Boy/LaFace/Arista)
 Marlo Thomas
 Thompson Twins
 Three Times Dope
 Pam Tillis (Arista Nashville)
 TLC (LaFace/Arista)
 Louis Tomlinson 
 Judy Torres (Profile/Arista)
 Total (Bad Boy/Arista)
 Toya
 The Tractors (Arista Nashville)
 Tanya Tucker (Arista Nashville)
 Dwight Twilley Band
 Tycoon
 Ryan Tyler (Arista Nashville)
 Travis Porter

U
 Carrie Underwood (Arista Nashville)
 UPSAHL
 Usher (LaFace/Arista)
 Uropa Lula

V
 Vanilla Ice
 Phil Vassar (Arista Nashville)
 Mario Vazquez

W
 Loudon Wainwright III
 Butch Walker
 Steve Wariner (Arista Nashville)
 Jennifer Warnes
 Dionne Warwick
 Westlife (outside United States with the release of their 2000 debut album featuring the #1 UK hit single “Swear It Again”, as the group’s first and only single to be charted in the US)
 Whodini (Jive/Arista)
 Calvin Wiggett (Arista Nashville)
 Michelle Wright (Arista Nashville)
 Weston Estate

Y
Yes
YoungBloodZ (Ghet-O-Vision/LaFace/Arista)
Yung Bae

Z
 Mackenzie Ziegler
 Zones

References

Arista Records